Patagoniodes is a snout moth genus in the subfamily Phycitinae described by Rolf-Ulrich Roesler in 1969.

It currently contains seven species, of which Patagoniodes popescugorji is the type species

Species
Patagoniodes farinaria (Turner, 1904)
Patagoniodes hoenei Roesler, 1969
Patagoniodes kurtharzi Roesler, 1983
Patagoniodes likiangella Roesler, 1969
Patagoniodes nipponella Ragonot, 1901
Patagoniodes popescugorji Roesler, 1969
Patagoniodes semari Roesler & Kuppers, 1981

References

External links

Phycitinae